Badgley Mischka  is an American fashion label designed by Mark Badgley (born January 12, 1961 in East St. Louis, MO) and James Mischka (born December 23, 1960 in Burlington, WI). Their collections are said to be largely influenced by the style of the glamour of 1940s Hollywood while remaining simple and streamlined.

History

James Mischka began at Rice University as a biomedical engineering major and ultimately graduated with degrees in art history and managerial studies in 1985. Badgley and Mischka met at Parsons School of Design in Manhattan. The two launched the label Badgley Mischka in 1988, though their bridal business launched in 1996. In 1992, Badgley Mischka was acquired by Escada. In 2004, Escada sold Badgley Mischka to Candie's (later renamed Iconix Brand Group).

In September 2006, Badgley Mischka announced that Sharon Stone would replace Mary-Kate and Ashley Olsen as the brand's spokesperson.

In 2017, Iconix sold Badgley Mischka to Mark Badgley, James Mischka, and Titan Industries.

Gallery

See also

List of fashion designers

References

External links

Official website

Clothing companies of the United States
High fashion brands
American fashion designers
American companies established in 1988
1988 establishments in California